Red Clay is an unincorporated community in Whitfield County, in the U.S. state of Georgia.

History
Red Clay was the site of Cherokee Indian seasonal gatherings in the 1830s. The community's name is an accurate preservation of the native Cherokee-language name Elawa'-Diyi, meaning "Red-earth place". A post office called Red Clay was established in 1840, and remained in operation until 1905.

References

Unincorporated communities in Whitfield County, Georgia
Unincorporated communities in Georgia (U.S. state)